Shane Byrne (born 10 December 1976), often known as Shakey, is a British professional motorcycle road racer. He is a six-time champion of the British Superbike Championship (2003, 2008, 2012, 2014, 2016 and 2017), the only person in the history of the series to win six titles. He has also been a race winner in the Superbike World Championship and has competed in MotoGP.

The oldest rider competing in the 2018 British Superbike series, Byrne suffered serious injuries involving multiple fractures to his upper body after crashing during a test at Snetterton Circuit in May when placed third in the championship. He was successfully treated at Norwich University Hospital and confirmed the extent of his injuries via social media.

Byrne announced via social media on 24 July 2018 that the metal cage attached to his skull supporting his head and neck via his shoulders had been removed in favour of a neck-brace collar, but there was still many more months of recovery anticipated due to poor growth of new bone.

Prior to motorcycle racing Byrne was a London Underground worker. After racing he worked as a motorcycle race commentator for Eurosport television from 2019, and is also a manager and mentor to racer Bradley Ray.

Early days
Byrne was born in Lambeth, London. While working as a road tester for Fast Bikes magazine, he participated in track days on a Ducati 996 SPS at a wet Oulton Park. He caught the attention of Paul Bird, his future boss.

Byrne emerged in the British Superbike Championship in 1999, initially on a private Kawasaki. In 2001 he finished eighth in the championship on board the Performance House Suzuki, which had been previously raced in the 1997 World Superbike Championship, under the Harris brothers' business, Harris Performance. Byrne had five top-five finishes in the 2001 season and was champion of the Privateers' Cup; he was the privateer winner in 22 races out of 26.

Early Success
In 2002, he was signed by Mark Griffiths at Renegade Ducati to ride alongside Michael Rutter. He also achieved his first  British Superbike Championship win in the first race of round three at Donington Park after a race-long battle with Steve Plater on the Virgin Yamaha. At the end of 2002 he joined Paul Bird at MonsterMob Ducati controversially replacing reigning champion Steve Hislop. He stunned the paddock by storming to a string of wins, taking the title with ease. He impressed further by achieving a double win at Brands Hatch for the British round of the Superbike World Championship.

MotoGP  

For  he joined fellow Brit Jeremy McWilliams in MotoGP with Aprilia, although he missed several races because of injury. He spent much of  racing for Kenny Roberts' team on a KTM bike, before they were forced to pull out due to an internal dispute between the chassis and engine manufacturers. He raced in Malaysia and Qatar for Camel Honda, replacing the injured Troy Bayliss. But after finishing 14th and 13th, Byrne did not impress Honda and was replaced by Chris Vermeulen.

Back to Britain 1
For 2006 he returned to the British Superbike Championship with Rizla Suzuki squad. His first podium came in Race Seven despite suffering a severe stomach virus that weekend. He missed Races 11 and 12 after a 187 mph crash caused by a brake failure; he was not seriously injured. At Knockhill he qualified second and followed with a second-place finish in Race One. The team's first win of the season came in Race Two. This was despite the team's bikes having been stolen and dumped in a barn alongside horse manure the previous week. At the final round of the season he was running third when he highsided, being knocked out in the process. Although he again escaped serious injury, he was unable to compete in the final race of the year, which meant he slipped from fourth to sixth in the championship standings.

For 2007, Byrne was reunited with his former Monstermob boss, Paul Bird, who was now running the Stobart Vent-Axia team, a privateer team using the 1000cc Honda Fireblade. The Honda was competitive from the start, giving Byrne more opportunities to fight at the front. He finished fifth overall, with a win, a pole position, and nine further podiums.

For the 2008 British Superbike Championship, Byrne competed for the Airwaves Ducati squad on a Ducati 1098 alongside Leon Camier. The combo was immediately dominant. Byrne won three of the opening four races. In the second race at Oulton Park he went wide on Lap One, dropping to 13th place, but he fought back. Almost immediately after he passed Cal Crutchlow for third place, Leon Haslam hit Tom Sykes, giving Byrne the lead. This race was stopped four laps early after several riders, including Crutchlow and Karl Harris fell. In Race Two at Snetterton he was held up by a crash involving Harris on Lap One, dropping to 13th position before fighting back for the win. He finished each of the first 14 races on the podium, often coming through the field after poor starts.

World Superbikes
Twenty-four hours after clinching the British Superbike Championship, Byrne confirmed that he would compete in the 2009 World Superbike Championship with the Sterilgarda Ducati team along with Alex Polita. This was his first full-time World Superbike Championship, although he has made successful wild card appearances in the past. Byrne became Sterilgarda Ducati's sole rider in February (due to apparent financial problems forcing Polita out) and recorded his first podium with the team in second place in the first race at the San Marino round of the Championship.

Due to financial problems, the Sterilgarda team failed to announce its intention to compete in the 2010 Superbike World Championship season, leaving Byrne without a confirmed ride for 2010. In November 2009, Byrne announced that he had signed with the Althea Racing team for the 2010 season. He raced alongside former Honda rider Carlos Checa. He was well behind Checa in performance and had no top-five finishes by midseason. He said he was "bitterly disappointed" with the season as a whole.

Back to Britain 2 
Byrne returned to the British Superbike Championship in 2011 with Lincolnshire-based HM Plant Honda alongside Japanese rider and three-time British Superbike Champion Ryuichi Kiyonari.

In 2012, he made a return to Paul Bird Motorsport along with Stuart Easton.

In 2016, the Paul Bird Motorsport team switched from Kawasaki machinery to Ducati. Byrne competed in British Superbike Championship on a fully factory supported Ducati Panigale R sponsored by Be Wiser Insurance.

After racing
After serious injury ended his immediate participation in motorcycle sport, Byrne started to work as a race-weekend commentator.

In a 2021 interview, he confirmed he had not made any firm decision not to again participate, and that his confidence in his long-term recovery had been impacted by the UK's emergency reaction to COVID-19 where hospital specialists were redeployed into other areas of need, hence he was 'on hold' until further treatment was available.

Byrne has established a partnership and new sports management consultancy business with fellow television presenter Matt Roberts to mentor and progress young motorcycle racers. Matt Roberts co-wrote Byrne's book released in 2020 entitled Unshakeable.

In February 2022, it was announced that Byrne would be appearing in future episodes of The Late Brake Show, a YouTube Channel hosted by Jonny Smith. Byrne will be a guest presenter to ride and review motorcycles, with the first episode eponymously entitled 'Byrne Out'. 

Byrne is manager and mentor to superbike racer Bradley Ray, who won the 2022 BSB Championship and is contracted to ride in European rounds of World Superbikes for 2023.

Torrens Trophy
Bryne was awarded the prestigious Torrens Trophy in 2014 in recognition of his winning multiple British Superbike Championships.

Personal life
Byrne married Czech-national, Petra, in November 2010. The couple have two children and share their time between homes in Kent and Spain.

In 2021, a resurfaced video of Byrne inappropriately spraying champagne up an unsuspecting woman’s dress at an event in 2013 began circulating heavily on the internet. On April 2, 2021, Byrne released a public apology through Facebook.

Career statistics
Stats correct as of 19 October 2014

By championship

British Superbike Championship

 * Season still in progress

Notes
1.2011/2012 - Byrne qualified for "The Showdown" part of the British Superbike Championship season, thus before the 11th round he was awarded 500 points, plus the podium credits he had gained throughout the season. Podium credits are given to any rider finishing first, second, or third with three, two, and one points awarded respectively.
2.2013 - Byrne qualified for "The Showdown" part of the British Superbike Championship season, thus before the tenth round he was awarded 500 points, plus the podium credits he had gained throughout the season. Podium credits are given to anyone finishing first, second, or third with three, two, and one points awarded respectively.
3.2014/2015 - Byrne qualified for "The Showdown" part of the British Superbike Championship season, thus before the tenth round he was awarded 500 points, plus the podium credits he had gained throughout the season. Podium credits are given to anyone finishing first, second, or third, with five, three, and one points awarded respectively.

Superbike World Championship

See also
2006 British Superbike season
2008 British Superbike season
2009 Superbike World Championship season

References

Citations
Rizla Suzukis stolen
Rizla Suzukis recovered

External links

Official website
Team Sterilgarda BRC Racing website
World SBK rider stats

1976 births
Living people
People from Lambeth
British motorcycle racers
English motorcycle racers
English people of Irish descent
MotoGP World Championship riders
Superbike World Championship riders
British Superbike Championship riders
English expatriate sportspeople in Spain